Doisynoestrol (brand names Fenocyclin, Surestrine, Surestryl; former developmental code name RS-2874), also known as fenocycline, as well as cis-bisdehydrodoisynolic acid 7-methyl ether (BDDA ME), is a synthetic nonsteroidal estrogen of the doisynolic acid group that is no longer marketed. It is a methyl ether of bisdehydrodoisynolic acid. Doisynoestrol was described in the literature in 1945. It has about 0.02% of the relative binding affinity of estradiol for the estrogen receptor.

See also
 Allenolic acid
 Carbestrol
 Methallenestril
 Fenestrel

References

Abandoned drugs
Carboxylic acids
Phenanthrenes
Synthetic estrogens